Enda Scahill is an Irish banjo player from Corofin, County Galway. He is a four-time All-Ireland Champion and has performed with The Fureys, Frankie Gavin and The Chieftains. He is an ex-member of The Brock McGuire Band. In 2006 he released the album Humdinger with Paul Brock which was awarded Irish Music Album of the Year by The Irish Times and was released by Compass Records in Nashville, Tennessee.

Scahill is the founder of the band We Banjo 3 whose members include Martin Howley, David Howley and his brother Fergal Scahill. Earle Hitchner, music writer for The Wall Street Journal, describes We Banjo 3's playing as a "freshness and finesse bordering on the magical" and LiveIreland proclaiming them "the hottest group in Irish music."

Discography

 Humdinger(2006)
 Brock McGuire Band
 Pick It Up(2000)
 Roots of the Banjo Tree (2012) 
 Gather the Good (2014) 
 Live in Galway (2015) 
 String Theory (2016)

References

 Galway Arts Festival 
 The Irish Music Magazine Charts
 The Irish Music Review of "Humdinger"
 Irish Times Review of "Roots of The Banjo Tree"

External links
 Official Website
 We Banjo 3 (official website)

Irish banjoists
Year of birth missing (living people)
Living people